The Routhwood Elementary School in Newellton, Louisiana was listed on the National Register of Historic Places in 2015.

The listing included four buildings:
Classroom and Administrative Building (1957), a one-story brick building
Gymnasium (1967),
Auditorium-Cafeteria Building (1957), and
Library Building (1967)

References

School buildings on the National Register of Historic Places in Louisiana
Buildings and structures completed in 1957
Tensas Parish, Louisiana
Schools in Tensas Parish, Louisiana